Uncle Frank is a 2020 American comedy-drama film written, directed, and co-produced by Alan Ball. The film stars Paul Bettany and Sophia Lillis. Set in the 1970s, Uncle Frank is a road movie about a gay man who confronts his past.

It had its world premiere at the Sundance Film Festival on January 25, 2020. It was released on November 25, 2020, by Amazon Studios.

Plot
In 1973, 18-year-old Beth Bledsoe moves from her home in Creekville, South Carolina, to attend college in New York City. Her uncle Frank Bledsoe is a college professor there, and is the relative she feels closest to as he is more refined and thoughtful than the rest of the family.

Beth meets a boyfriend, Bruce, and shows up with him unannounced to a party at Frank’s apartment. Through events that happen at the party, she discovers that Frank is secretly gay and has been living with a man named Walid (“Wally”) for over ten years. Frank rejects the sexual advance on Bruce's part, caring for Beth when she gets too drunk. He pleads with her not to tell anyone else in the family his secret, and she agrees.

The next day, Beth’s grandfather and Frank’s father, Daddy Mac, dies of a sudden heart attack. Frank agrees to drive Beth back to South Carolina for the funeral. Wally asks to come along and meet Frank’s family, but Frank refuses, not yet ready to reveal the truth to them. However, Wally rents a car and follows them most of the way there; when Frank catches him, he agrees to let him come but stay in a motel during the funeral, fearful of what the locals might do if they discover their true relationship.

Along their journey, Frank has flashbacks to his teenage years and a sexual relationship he had with another boy named Samuel; his father caught them in bed together and called Frank an abomination against God. To cope with these memories, Frank begins secretly drinking; he asks Beth not to tell Wally as Frank is a recovering alcoholic.

Beth and Frank arrive home to attend the funeral. At the reading of the will, Frank learns he has been cut out of his inheritance, and the will bitterly exposes Frank’s homosexuality to the family. An emotional Frank flees, driving away erratically while drinking heavily. A panicked Beth rushes to inform Wally, who drives them to the nearby lake where he suspects Frank went. A final flashback reveals that Frank told Samuel they could not be together as it displeased God, and Samuel drowned himself in the lake shortly after. Wally and Beth discover Frank’s clothes sitting on a dock by the water, but Frank is nowhere to be seen.

Wally and Beth return to the motel, where Wally grieves for Frank’s supposed death. However, a drunken Frank returns, claiming he just went for a swim. An argument ensues as Wally confronts Frank for his drinking; Frank punches Wally and calls him a faggot before fleeing again. They later reconcile at Samuel’s grave as Frank expresses guilt for his death. Frank laments that he has no family left; Wally reassures him that he is Frank's family. After an impassioned speech from Beth, Frank agrees to let Wally meet his family. While Frank’s brother-in-law is unable to morally accept the truth, his siblings and mother have no problem with the secret and warmly welcome Wally.

Cast
 Paul Bettany as Frank Bledsoe
 Cole Doman as Young Frank Bledsoe
 Sophia Lillis as Beth Bledsoe
 Peter Macdissi as Walid "Wally" Nadeem
 Steve Zahn as Mike Bledsoe
 Judy Greer as Kitty Bledsoe
 Margo Martindale as Mammaw Bledsoe
 Stephen Root as Daddy Mac
 Lois Smith as Aunt Butch
 Jane McNeill as Neva
 Burgess Jenkins as Beau
Colton Ryan as Bruce
 Caity Brewer as Marsha
 Michael Perez as Sam Lassiter
 Zach Strum as Tee Dub

Release
It had its world premiere at the Sundance Film Festival on January 25, 2020. Shortly after, Amazon Studios acquired distribution rights to the film. It was released on November 25, 2020.

Reception
The site's critics consensus reads: "Uncle Frank finds writer-director Alan Ball still untangling the modern American family dynamic, aided by standout work from Paul Bettany and Sophia Lillis." Metacritic reports a score of 58 out of 100, based on 21 critic reviews, indicating "mixed or average reviews".

Awards and nominations

References

External links
 

2020 films
Amazon Studios films
American road comedy-drama films
American LGBT-related films
Films set in 1973
Films shot in North Carolina
Gay-related films
Miramax films
LGBT-related comedy-drama films
2020 LGBT-related films
2020 comedy-drama films
Films about dysfunctional families
2020 independent films
Films produced by Bill Block
Films scored by Nathan Barr
Amazon Prime Video original films
2020s English-language films
2020s American films